Agios Vlasios (Greek: Άγιος Βλάσιος meaning Saint Blaise) may refer to several places:

In Cyprus

Agios Vlasios, Cyprus

In Greece

Agios Vlasios, Inachos, a village in Aetolia-Acarnania, part of the municipality Inachos
Agios Vlasios, Parakampylia, a village in Aetolia-Acarnania, part of the municipality Parakampylia
Agios Vlasios, Boeotia, a village in Boeotia
Agios Vlasios, Euboea, a village in Euboea
Agios Vlasios, Magnesia, a village in Magnesia 
Agios Vlasios, Thesprotia, a village in Thesprotia 
Agios Vlasios, Glastra, a Settlement in Glastra

Related

Ano Agios Vlasios, a village in Aetolia-Acarnania, Greece 
Kato Agios Vlasios, a village in Aetolia-Acarnania